Walter Tomsen (March 4, 1912 – December 30, 2000) was a sport shooter and Olympic medalist for the United States. He won a silver medal in the 50 metre rifle prone event at the 1948 Summer Olympics in London.

References

External links

1912 births
2000 deaths
Sportspeople from Kyiv
American male sport shooters
United States Distinguished Marksman
ISSF rifle shooters
Olympic silver medalists for the United States in shooting
Shooters at the 1948 Summer Olympics
Medalists at the 1948 Summer Olympics
20th-century American people